Jakub Šiřina (born 21 November 1987) is a Czech basketball player for BK Opava of the Czech Republic National Basketball League (NBL) and the Czech Republic national team.

National team career
Šiřina represented the Czech Republic at the EuroBasket in 2015 and 2017. He was also chosen to play for the team at the 2019 FIBA World Cup.

References

1987 births
Living people
Czech men's basketball players
Point guards
Sportspeople from Ostrava
BK Opava players
BK NH Ostrava players
2019 FIBA Basketball World Cup players
Basketball players at the 2020 Summer Olympics
Olympic basketball players of the Czech Republic